Kim S. Pegula (née Kerr; born June 7, 1969) is an American businesswoman and, with her husband Terry Pegula, one of the principal owners of the Buffalo Bills of the National Football League (NFL). She is also the president of Pegula Sports and Entertainment, the holding company that manages the Bills as well as the Buffalo Sabres of the National Hockey League; the Buffalo Bandits and Rochester Knighthawks of the National Lacrosse League; and the Rochester Americans of the American Hockey League. The company also manages the LECOM Harborcenter and Black River Entertainment, an independent record label based in Nashville. By extension she is the president of several teams under Pegula Sports and Entertainment, including the Bills and Sabres. Pegula, Shahid Khan, and Zygi Wilf are the only three NFL team owners who were not born in the United States.

Early life
Pegula was born in Seoul, South Korea. She reportedly has no recollection of her birth name and no record of her biological parents nor any account of her life in South Korea, only her date of birth, a secondhand account of being abandoned in the streets of Seoul at the age of five, and a DNA test that showed that one of her parents was likely Japanese.She was brought to the United States and was adopted by Ralph and Marilyn Kerr on December 30, 1974. She grew up with her adopted family in Fairport, New York, a suburb of Rochester. Pegula participated in cheerleading and the school band, playing bassoon. After following her brothers' footsteps in enrolling at Houghton College, she and a roommate made plans to venture to Alaska to work near a fishing camp upon hearing there was money to be made. Unable to afford the fare, she applied for work at a restaurant in Belfast, New York; while interviewing for a waitressing gig, she met Terry Pegula who was dining at the restaurant. In 1991, Terry offered her a job at his natural gas company and they eventually entered a relationship; they married in 1993.

Career
Pegula was involved in her husband's company, East Resources, from 1991 to its sale in 2010. Shortly afterwards, the Pegulas purchased the Buffalo Sabres and its two affiliated teams, the Buffalo Bandits of the NLL and the Rochester Americans of the AHL. She influenced the planning and construction of LECOM Harborcenter, a mixed-use development next to the Sabres' arena and part of the revitalization of downtown Buffalo. After the death of longtime Buffalo Bills owner Ralph Wilson, the football team was put up for sale. The Pegulas competed with real-estate mogul (and former U.S. president) Donald Trump and also a consortium of rock singer Jon Bon Jovi and key people in Toronto-based Maple Leaf Sports and Entertainment for the team. The Pegulas won with an NFL record $1.4 billion all-cash bid. 

Following the acquisition Kim and Terry Pegula reorganized their sports franchises, along with record label Black River Entertainment into a new company, Pegula Sports and Entertainment. She helped coin the term "One Buffalo" and is also involved with the NFL Foundation. The Pegulas have also donated significant amounts of money to their alma maters, including $12 million to Houghton College, which allowed it to build a new athletics complex and transition to NCAA Division III. A fan of desserts, Pegula helped formulate "One Buffalo" branded premium ice cream and cupcake products. Since its formation Pegula Sports and Entertainment, with Kim Pegula as its president and CEO, has made several acquisitions of property in Buffalo and launched a regional sports network, MSG Western New York. The company also acquired two more professional sports teams, the Buffalo Beauts of the National Women's Hockey League (until divesting of the team a year later) and the Rochester Knighthawks of the National Lacrosse League.

In March 2018, Pegula was named to the National Football League’s business ventures committee, replacing Russ Brandon. Pegula is on the NFL’s Super Bowl and major-event advisory committee. 

On May 1, 2018, after the abrupt resignation of Brandon as president of Pegula Sports and Entertainment as well as the Bills and Sabres, Pegula was installed as president over all of the Pegula Sports and Entertainment properties. She became the first female team president in the history of both the NFL and NHL when she became president of the Bills and Sabres franchises. Pegula is also one of a handful of female NFL owners, including Sheila Ford Hamp (Detroit Lions), Virginia Halas McCaskey (Chicago Bears), Amy Adams Strunk (Tennessee Titans), Carol Davis (Las Vegas Raiders), Denise DeBartolo York (San Francisco 49ers), Gayle Benson (New Orleans Saints),  Janice McNair (Houston Texans), Jody Allen (Seattle Seahawks) and Dee Haslam (Cleveland Browns).

Personal life
Terry and Kim Pegula have three children, Kelly, Matthew, and Jessica, who is a professional tennis player. Kim has two stepchildren, Michael and Laura, from Terry's previous marriage. The Pegulas have homes in East Aurora, New York, and Boca Raton, Florida.

In June 2022, Pegula was hospitalized in an intensive care unit in Boca Raton for reasons the family would not disclose. Pegula's daughter Jessica later stated that her mother's condition had improved by the time of Jessica's appearance at the 2022 Wimbledon Championships and was rehabilitating. On February 7, 2023, Jessica Pegula revealed in a Players' Tribune article that Kim Pegula's hospitalization was due to her having gone into cardiac arrest, which progressed into a "brain injury" leading to "significant expressive aphasia and significant memory issues" due to the prolonged lack of oxygen to her brain. Jessica Pegula credited her sister, Kelly, for saving their mother's life as she had taken a CPR class just months prior.

References

External links
Pegula Sports and Entertainment official web site
Profile on Kim Pegula By the Rochester Democrat and Chronicle
 Kim Pegula – Bio at the Buffalo Bills' official website

1969 births
American billionaires
American sports businesspeople
Buffalo Bills executives
Buffalo Bills
Buffalo Sabres executives
Businesspeople from Rochester, New York
Living people
National Football League team presidents
National Hockey League team presidents
National Lacrosse League owners
People from Fairport, New York
Businesspeople from Seoul
South Korean emigrants to the United States
Women in American professional sports management
Women National Football League executives
Women sports owners
Women ice hockey executives
20th-century American businesspeople
20th-century American businesswomen
21st-century American businesspeople
21st-century American businesswomen
Buffalo Bills owners